Unfinished Business is a 2009 South African mockumentary about constructing a peak on a table top mountain.

Production

A mobile film crew was able to film mockumentary-style interviews with residents and tourists discussing the possibility of a peak and their views. The film also documents how a peak on a table top mountain would affect extreme sports.

CGI software rendered 8 million points of data to give the mountain multiple characteristics required for skydiving and other extreme sports.

Screenings and Reception

Unfinished Business has been screened at a number of festivals in the UK, Canada, South Africa and Poland including the Tampere festival, Rossland Mountain Film Festival, Llanberis Mountain Film Festival, Valentines Film Festival and Vancouver Film Festival.

References
http://unfinishedbusiness.co.za/category/reviews/
http://www.inbaseline.com/project.aspx?project_id=202126
http://www.duesouth.co.za/

2009 films
2009 comedy films